SMA4 may stand for:

 Spinal muscular atrophy (SMA) type 4
 Super Mario Advance 4: Super Mario Bros. 3
 SMA Negeri 4 Pontianak (Pontianak State High School #4), Pontianak, Indonesia

See also
 SMA (disambiguation)